Quentin Claudian Stephen Bell (19 August 1910 – 16 December 1996) was an English art historian and author.

Early life
Bell was born in London, the second and younger son of the art critic and writer Clive Bell and the painter and interior designer Vanessa Bell (née Stephen). He was a nephew of Virginia Woolf (née Stephen). He was educated at the Quaker Leighton Park School and at Cambridge.

Career
After being educated at Leighton Park School and in Paris, Bell became a Lecturer in Art History at the Department of Fine Art, King's College, University of Durham from 1952 to 1959, then became the first Professor of Fine Art at the University of Leeds from 1959 to 1967. In 1964 he was appointed Slade Professor of Fine Art at Oxford University and, in 1965, Ferens Professor of Fine Art at the University of Hull. Bell was a Professor of Art History and Theory at the University of Sussex from 1967 to 1975.

He sometimes worked as an artist, principally in ceramics, but for his career he was drawn to academia and to book-writing. Bell's biography of his famous aunt, Virginia Woolf: A Biography, 2 vols (London: Hogarth Press, 1972), won not only the James Tait Black Memorial Prize, but also the Duff Cooper Prize and the Yorkshire Post Book of the Year Award. He also wrote several books on the Bloomsbury Group and Charleston Farmhouse.

Family
He was married to Anne Olivier Bell (née Popham).  They had three children: Julian Bell, an artist and muralist; Cressida Bell, a textile designer; and Virginia Nicholson, the writer of Charleston: A Bloomsbury House and Garden, Among the Bohemians and Singled Out.

Bell had an older brother, the poet Julian Bell, who died in the Spanish Civil War in 1937. The writer and artist Angelica Garnett was his half-sister, and Amaryllis and Henrietta Garnett were his nieces.

Death
Quentin Bell died in Sussex, and is buried in the churchyard of St. Peter's Church, West Firle, East Sussex.

References

Bibliography

External links 

 The Quentin Bell Collection at the Victoria University Library at the University of Toronto
 "Eminent Charlestonians with illustrations by Quentin Bell and text by Virginia Woolf" via Discovering Literature at the British Library

1910 births
1996 deaths
Bloomsbury Group
English art historians
People educated at Leighton Park School
Stephen-Bell family
Academics of Durham University
James Tait Black Memorial Prize recipients
Academics of the University of Leeds
Bloomsbury Group biographers
20th-century biographers
Slade Professors of Fine Art (University of Oxford)
People from Firle